Paul Stephen Loverde  (born September 3, 1940) is an American prelate of the Catholic Church.  Loverde served as bishop of the Diocese of Arlington in Northern Virginia from 1998 to 2016.

Loverde previously served as bishop of the Diocese of Ogdensburg in Northern New York from 1993 to 1998 and as an auxiliary bishop of the Archdiocese of Hartford in Connecticut from 1988 to 1993.

Biography

Early life and education
Paul Loverde was born on September 3, 1940, in Framingham, Massachusetts, the son of Paul and Ann Marie Loverde. Loverde received his secondary school education at La Salle Academy in Providence, Rhode Island, followed by an education at Saint Bernard Seminary College in Rochester, New York.

Loverde graduated with a bachelor's degree (summa cum laude) from Saint Bernard in 1962 and was chosen to study in Rome at the Pontifical Gregorian University.  Loverde earned his Licentiate of Sacred Theology there in 1966.

Ordination and ministry
Loverde was ordained a priest for the Diocese of Norwich on December 18, 1965, in St. Peter's Basilica in Rome by Bishop Francis F. Reh. After completing his studies in Rome in 1966, Loverde returned to Connecticut.

Loverde served assistant pastor at St. Sebastian Parish in Middletown, Connecticut and as a religion teacher at various high schools.  He also served as campus chaplain at the following institutions in Connecticut:
 Wesleyan University in Middletown
 Connecticut College in New London
 Eastern Connecticut State University in Willimantic

Loverde also serve as an instructor of canon law at Holy Apostles Seminary in Cromwell, Connecticut. In 1982, he received a Licentiate of Canon Law from the Catholic University of America School of Canon Law in Washington, DC.

Auxiliary Bishop of Hartford

On February 3, 1988, Pope John Paul II named Loverde as an auxiliary bishop of the Archdiocese of Hartford and titular bishop of Octabia. He was consecrated on April 12, 1988, by Archbishop John F. Whealon at the Cathedral of St. Joseph in Hartford, Connecticut

Loverde chose his episcopal motto, "Encourage and Teach with Patience," (2 Timothy 4:2)   from Second Epistle of St. Paul to Timothy, expressing his belief that, as Bishop, it is "his duty and calling by God to encourage and teach the faith to those who need it, with the gentle patience that each of God's children may need."

Bishop of Ogdensburg

On November 11, 1993, John Paul II appointed Loverde as the eleventh bishop of the Diocese of Ogdensburg. He was installed at the Cathedral of St. Mary in Ogdensburg, New York, on January 17, 1994. While in Ogdensburg, Loverde started vocation and evangelization initiatives. In 1999, he closed Mater Dei College in Oswegatchie, New York. From 1997 to 1999, Loverde was state chaplain of the New York Knights of Columbus.

Bishop of Arlington
After the sudden death of Bishop John Keating on March 22, 1998, John Paul II appointed Loverde as the third bishop of the Diocese of Arlington.  He was installed on March 25, 1999, at the Cathedral of St. Thomas More in Arlington, Virginia.

Loverde reinstated the permanent diaconate program, and allowed seminarians to study at Blessed John XXIII National Seminary in Weston, Massachusetts,  the Pontifical College Josephinum in Columbus, Ohio, and The Catholic University of America.  He also supported religious orders coming into the diocese, such as the Franciscan Sisters of the Eucharist and the Cloistered Dominicans.

Loverde was on the board of directors for the Institute for the Psychological Sciences in Arlington, Virginia, The Catholic University of America,  the Catholic Distance University in Charles Town, West Virginia and the Basilica of the National Shrine of the Immaculate Conception in Washington, D.C.  He previously served on the board of Christ the King Seminary and Mount St. Mary's University in Emmitsburg, Maryland  Within the United States Conference of Catholic Bishops (USCCB). Loverde was chair of the Committee on Vocations from 1995 to 1998 and was a member of the Administrative Committee from 2004 to 2008.

Loverde won the Catholic Distance University's Founder's Award for his service to the university in 2010 and the Saint Luke Institute's Saint Luke Award in 2012.  In 2012, a Doctor of Humane Letters was conferred upon Loverde by the Institute for the Psychological Sciences.

On June 20, 2012, a woman sued Loverde and the diocese, claiming that a diocesan priest, Thomas J. Euteneur, had sexually abused her on several occasions in 2008.  The defendant stated that Euteneur, under the guise of conducting an exorcism, had kissed and fondled her.  The woman said that Loverde and the diocese had given Euteneur permission to perform exorcisms.

In 2006, Loverde permitted female altar servers, at the discretion of the local pastors, in parishes and high school communities in the Diocese of Arlington for the first time. Prior to this year, Arlington was one of only two dioceses in the United States to forbid girls from being altar servers. Loverde had sent a dubium about the altar girl matter to the Holy See's Congregation for Divine Worship and Discipline of the Sacraments. The congregation responded that while bishops may allow female altar servers, pastors and priests cannot be compelled to use them.

Retirement 
Pope Francis accepted Loverde's letter of retirement as bishop of the Diocese of Arlington on October 4, 2016, and appointed Michael F. Burbidge as his successor.

See also

 Catholic Church hierarchy
 Catholic Church in the United States
 Historical list of the Catholic bishops of the United States
 List of Catholic bishops of the United States
 Lists of patriarchs, archbishops, and bishops

References

External links

 
 Diocese of Arlington
 Diocese of Ogdensburg
 Archdiocese of Hartford

Episcopal succession

1940 births
Living people
Roman Catholic bishops of Arlington
Roman Catholic bishops of Ogdensburg
20th-century Roman Catholic bishops in the United States
21st-century Roman Catholic bishops in the United States
People from Framingham, Massachusetts
Roman Catholic auxiliary bishops of Hartford
Catholics from Massachusetts
Catholic University of America School of Canon Law alumni
Saint Bernard's Seminary alumni
Pontifical Gregorian University alumni
American expatriates in Italy
Catholic University of America alumni